Nicholas Connor (also known as Nick Connor) is an English filmmaker. Best known for his work on the film Cotton Wool.
In 2017 he was awarded the 'Ones to Watch' Award by Into Film at the Odeon Leicester Square. Presented by actor Charles Dance and producer Barbara Broccoli, sponsored by EON Productions. Connor presently lives in Oldham, England.

Career 

Nicholas Connor started his career as a script supervisor and then attended the BFI Film Academy at HOME in Manchester.

In 2016 he directed Northern Lights, which received a mixed critical response. Chris Olson from UK Film Review gave the film 4 stars calling it "a beautiful piece of filmmaking". Jennie Kermode for 'Eye for Film' gave the film 3 stars, stating "Northern Lights may sometimes by lacking in energy but it doesn't outstay its welcome and overall it's an impressive debut."

In 2017, aged 17, he directed Cotton Wool with a cast including Leanne Best and Crissy Rock. The film was shot by BAFTA winning cinematographer Alan C. McLaughlin. The film was supported in its research by the British Stroke Association and received a 12A by the British Board of Film Classification. The film received a 5 star review from ScreenCritix, which stated "he is really coming into his own and certainly cementing his status as one of the UK’s hottest prospects." The film's red carpet premiere took place in Oldham, England.

In December 2017 he featured on BBC News to talk about his career. He won the UK Inspirational Children and Young Peoples Award for Arts and Culture in 2018.

Filmography

Awards and nominations

Festivals Accolations

Personal life 
Connor grew up in his hometown of Oldham. His sister is LPGA golf professional 'Rachel Connor'.

References

English filmmakers
Living people
1999 births
People from Oldham